The 2014 IRB Junior World Championship was the seventh annual international rugby union competition for Under 20 national teams. The event was organised in Auckland, New Zealand by rugby's governing body, World Rugby, then known as the International Rugby Board. A total of 12 nations took part in the tournament. England went into the tournament as defending champions, after winning the tournament for the first time in 2013. England went on to win the Championship for a second time in two years. While hosts New Zealand, the most successful team in the tournament, were looking to win the title for the first time since 2011.

Italy were the champions of the 2013 IRB Junior World Rugby Trophy, thus being promoted to the Championship. Fiji finished last in 2014 and therefore were relegated to the World Rugby Under 20 Trophy for 2015.

This was the final event to be known as the "IRB Junior World Championship". Following the renaming of the governing body as World Rugby, the Championship was renamed the World Rugby Under 20 Championship, and the second-tier competition was renamed from "IRB Junior World Rugby Trophy" to World Rugby Under 20 Trophy.

Venues
The championship was held across three two location, Auckland and Pukekohe. ECOLight Stadium and QBE Stadium are only designated to the pool matches, while Eden Park will be used for top three play-offs; Final, 3rd place play-off and 5th place play-off.

Teams
The following teams participated in the 2014 IRB Junior World Championship:

Match officials
Below are the list of officials that officiated across the 30 matches:

Referees
  Federico Anselmi (Argentina)
  Angus Gardner (Australia)
  Matt O'Brien (Australia)
  Alexandre Ruiz (France)
  Akihisa Aso (Japan)
  Ben O'Keefe (New Zealand)
  Vlad Iordăchescu (Romania)
  Marius van der Westhuizen (South Africa)
  Joaquín Montes (Uruguay)

Reserve or Assistant Referees
  Brett Johnson (New Zealand)
  Richard Kelly (New Zealand)
  Angus Mabey (New Zealand)
  Shane McDermott (New Zealand)
  Brendon Pickerill (New Zealand)
  Grant Stuart (New Zealand)
  Paul Williams (New Zealand)

Television match officials
  Vinny Munro (New Zealand)
  Glenn Newman (New Zealand)
  Peter Nock (New Zealand)
  Aaron Paterson (New Zealand)
  Ben Skeen (New Zealand)
  Chris Wratt (New Zealand)

Pool stage
The playing schedule and pools were announced on 28 November 2013.

All times are in New Zealand Standard Time (UTC+12)

The points awarded in the Pool Stage are as follows: 
 4 points for a win
 2 points for a draw
 1 bonus scoring point for scoring 4 or more tries
 1 bonus losing point for losing by 7 or less points
 0 points for a loss above 7 points

If at completion of the Pool Stage two or more teams are level on points the following tiebreakers are applied:

 The winner of the Match in which the two tied Teams have played each other;
 The Team which has the best difference between points scored for and points scored against in all its Pool Matches;
 The Team which has the best difference between tries scored for and tries scored against in all its Pool Matches;
 The Team which has scored most points in all its Pool Matches;
 The Team which has scored most tries in all its Pool Matches; and
 If none of the above produce a result, then it will be resolved with a toss of a coin.

Pld = matches played, W = matches won, D = draws, L = losses, PF = match points for, PA = match points against, PD = Points difference between match points for and match points against, TF = tries for, TA = tries against, BP = bonus points, Pts = pool points

Pool A
{| class="wikitable" style="text-align: center;"
|-
!width="200"|Team
!width="20"|Pld
!width="20"|W
!width="20"|D
!width="20"|L
!width="20"|PF
!width="20"|PA
!width="20"|PD
!width="20"|TF
!width="20"|TA
!width="20"|BP
!width="20"|Pts
|-style="background:#ccffcc"
|align=left| 
| 3 || 3 || 0 || 0 || 118 || 43 || +75 || 15 || 4 || 2 || 14
|-style="background:#ffe6bd"
|align=left| 
| 3 || 2 || 0 || 1 || 89 || 58 || +31 || 11 || 7 || 2 || 10
|-style="background:#fcc"
|align=left| 
| 3 || 1 || 0 || 2 || 35 || 118 || −83 || 2 || 15 || 0 || 4
|-style="background:#fcc"
|align=left| 
| 3 || 0 || 0 || 3 || 59 || 82 || −23 || 5 || 7 || 2 || 2
|-
|}

Pool B
{| class="wikitable" style="text-align: center;"
|-
!width="200"|Team
!width="20"|Pld
!width="20"|W
!width="20"|D
!width="20"|L
!width="20"|PF
!width="20"|PA
!width="20"|PD
!width="20"|TF
!width="25"|TA
!width="20"|BP
!width="20"|Pts
|-style="background:#ccffcc"
|align=left| 
| 3 || 2 || 0 || 1 || 86 || 40 || +46 || 10 || 4 || 3 || 11
|-style="background:#ffe6bd"
|align=left| 
| 3 || 2 || 0 || 1 || 82 || 57 || +25 || 10 || 7 || 1 || 9
|-style="background:#ffe6bd"
|align=left| 
| 3 || 2 || 0 || 1 || 59 || 31 || +28 || 7 || −3 || 1 || 9
|-style="background:#fcc"
|align=left| 
| 3 || 0 || 0 || 3 || 24 || 123 || −89 || 4 || 17 || 0 || 0
|-
|}

Pool C
{| class="wikitable" style="text-align: center;"
|-
!width="200"|Team
!width="20"|Pld
!width="20"|W
!width="20"|D
!width="20"|L
!width="20"|PF
!width="20"|PA
!width="20"|PD
!width="25"|TF
!width="20"|TA
!width="20"|BP
!width="20"|Pts
|-style="background:#ccffcc"
|align=left| 
| 3 || 3 || 0 || 0 || 115 || 37 || +78 || 16 || 5 || 2 || 14
|-style="background:#ccffcc"
|align=left| 
| 3 || 2 || 0 || 1 || 126 || 52 || +74 || 18 || 7 || 2 || 10
|-style="background:#ffe6bd"
|align=left| 
| 3 || 1 || 0 || 2 || 47 || 87 || −40 || 6 || 13 || 0 || 4
|-style="background:#fcc"
|align=left| 
| 3 || 0 || 0 || 3 || 30 || 142 || −112 || 5 || 20 || 0 || 0
|-
|}

Standings after Pool Stage

Knockout stage

9–12th place play-offs

Semifinals

11th place game

9th place game

5–8th place play-offs

Semifinals

7th place game

5th place game

Finals

Semifinals

3rd place game

Final

Notes

References

External links
 IRB Junior World Championship–from IRB website

2014
2014 rugby union tournaments for national teams
2014 in New Zealand rugby union
International rugby union competitions hosted by New Zealand
rugby union